Cloud Peak is the highest peak within the Bighorn Mountains in the U.S. state of Wyoming.

Location 
The mountain can be climbed most easily from the western side, accessed by either the Battle Park or West Tensleep trail-heads and is roughly 24 miles round-trip from both. The peak is located in the 189,000 acre (765 km²) Cloud Peak Wilderness within Bighorn National Forest. The northeast slope of Cloud Peak is a deep cirque which harbors Cloud Peak Glacier, the last active glacier in the Bighorn Mountains.

Cloud Peak is on the border between Johnson County and Big Horn County in Wyoming and is the high point of both counties.  As the high point of an isolated range, Cloud Peak has the greatest topographic prominence in the state, one foot more than the state's highest mountain,  Gannett Peak, and fifteenth greatest in the contiguous United States.

See also
 4000 meter peaks of North America
 Central Rocky Mountains
 Mountain peaks of North America
 Mountain peaks of the Rocky Mountains
 Mountain peaks of the United States
 List of Ultras of North America
 List of Ultras of the United States

References

External links

Mountains of Big Horn County, Wyoming
Mountains of Johnson County, Wyoming
Mountains of Wyoming
Bighorn National Forest
North American 4000 m summits